Anastasia of Kiev (1023 – 1074/1094) was Queen of Hungary by marriage to King Andrew the White.

Life

Anastasia was a daughter of Grand Prince Yaroslav I the Wise of Kiev and Ingigerd of Sweden, and the older sister of the French queen Anne of Kiev. Around 1038 Anastasia married Duke Andrew of Hungary, who had settled down in Kiev after his father Vazul took part in a failed assassination attempt aimed at King Stephen I of Hungary. In 1046, her husband returned to Hungary and ascended the throne after defeating King Peter Urseolo. Anastasia followed her husband to the kingdom. It was probably she who persuaded her husband to set up a lavra in Tihany for hermits who had come to Hungary from the Kievan Rus'.

The royal couple did not have a son until 1053, when Queen Anastasia gave birth to Solomon. However, Solomon's birth and later coronation caused a bitter conflict between King Andrew I and his younger brother Duke Béla, who had been next in line to the throne. When Duke Béla rose in open rebellion against King Andrew in 1060, the king sent his wife and children to the court of Adalbert, Margrave of Austria. King Andrew was defeated and died shortly afterwards, and his brother was crowned king on 6 December 1060.

Anastasia sought the help of King Henry IV of Germany, whose sister Judith had been engaged to Solomon in 1058. By the time the German troops entered to Hungary to give assistance to Solomon, King Béla I had died (on 11 September 1063) and his sons, Géza, Ladislaus and Lampert had fled to Poland.

The young Solomon was crowned on 27 September 1063. On the occasion of her son's coronation, Anastasia presented what was believed to be the sword of Attila the Hun to Duke Otto of Bavaria, who was the leader of the German troops. Between 1060 and 1073 King Solomon governed his kingdom in collaboration with his cousins, Dukes Géza, Ladislaus and Lampert, who had returned to Hungary and accepted his rule. However, in 1074 they rebelled against him, and defeated him on 14 March 1074. King Solomon fled to the Western borders of Hungary where he was able to maintain his rule only over the counties of Moson and Pozsony.

Anastasia had followed Solomon, but they began to argue with each other. So she moved to Admont Abbey where she lived as a nun until her death. She was buried in the Abbey.

Marriage and children
c. 1039: King Andrew I of Hungary (c. 1015 – before 6 December 1060)
 Adelaide (c. 1040 – 27 January 1062), wife of king Vratislaus II of Bohemia
 King Solomon of Hungary (1053 – 1087)
 David of Hungary (after 1053 – after 1094)

Notes

Sources

 Kristó, Gyula – Makk, Ferenc: Az Árpád-ház uralkodói (IPC Könyvek, 1996)
 Korai Magyar Történeti Lexikon (9–14. század), főszerkesztő: Kristó, Gyula, szerkesztők: Engel, Pál és Makk, Ferenc (Akadémiai Kiadó, Budapest, 1994)
 Magyarország Történeti Kronológiája I. – A kezdetektől 1526-ig, főszerkesztő: Benda, Kálmán (Akadémiai Kiadó, Budapest, 1981)

Hungarian queens consort
Kievan Rus' princesses
1020s births
11th-century deaths
Rurik dynasty
House of Árpád
11th-century Rus' people
11th-century Rus' women
11th-century Hungarian women
11th-century Hungarian people
Year of birth uncertain
Queen mothers
Year of death uncertain